Paulo Sérgio Cardoso da Costa (born 5 December 1979) is a Portuguese footballer who played as an attacking midfielder.

After playing professionally in Portugal, Italy, France and Greece, he finally moved to Cyprus in his mid-20s, spending his remaining career there.

He scored once from 42 Primeira Liga games over the course of three seasons, representing Alverca, Porto and Gil Vicente in the competition.

Club career
Born in Moita, Setúbal District, Costa began playing as a senior at Sporting Clube Lourinhanense, Sporting Clube de Portugal's farm team. In 1999 he joined F.C. Alverca, rejoining another youth product of the Primeira Liga powerhouse, Marco Caneira.

In June 2000, both Costa and Caneira signed with Inter Milan, who bought the pair in a co-ownership deal with Reggina Calcio. Costa was sold for €2 million and, in June 2001, Reggina acquired him outright for €1,3 million and Inter bought back Caneira for an undisclosed fee; however, in July Costa was bought back from Reggina for €1,6 million and, in a continuing series of unassuming loans, then played with FC Porto (which also acquired 50% registration rights for €1,5 million), A.C. Venezia and FC Girondins de Bordeaux, rejoining former teammate Caneira in the latter (with the first and third clubs, he was often demoted to the reserves); he returned to Portugal for the 2004–05 season, joining Gil Vicente FC.

Costa joined Aris Thessaloniki F.C. from Greece in January 2006, with his new club starting the second division season in poor fashion but improving their game and results under Nikos Anastopoulos and eventually returning to the Superleague, with the player contributing with 13 games; the following campaign he scored a career-best seven goals, with Aris overachieving for a final fourth place as he formed a successful offensive partnership with Koke.

In August 2007, Costa started a Cypriot adventure, as many Portuguese players in that timeframe years, by joining Aris Limassol FC. On 3 January 2008 he signed a three-and-a-half-year contract with another side in the country, Anorthosis Famagusta FC.

On 28 December 2008, continuing in Cyprus, Costa signed a six-month contract with APOEL FC, but had it mutually rescinded on 13 March of the following year. In August 2009 he returned to Greece and penned a two-year deal with Levadiakos FC, leaving the club in January 2010 and moving back to Cyprus, signing for one-and-a-half-years with domestic cup holders APOP Kinyras FC.

Costa moved to Ermis Aradippou for 2010–11, but was released shortly after. He finished the season with another team in the country, former club Aris Limassol, netting four goals as they returned to the top flight after one year.

References

External links

1979 births
Living people
People from Moita
Portuguese footballers
Association football midfielders
Primeira Liga players
Segunda Divisão players
F.C. Alverca players
FC Porto players
FC Porto B players
Gil Vicente F.C. players
Serie A players
Serie B players
Reggina 1914 players
Inter Milan players
Venezia F.C. players
Ligue 1 players
FC Girondins de Bordeaux players
Super League Greece players
Football League (Greece) players
Aris Thessaloniki F.C. players
Levadiakos F.C. players
Cypriot First Division players
Cypriot Second Division players
Aris Limassol FC players
Anorthosis Famagusta F.C. players
APOEL FC players
APOP Kinyras FC players
Ermis Aradippou FC players
Portugal youth international footballers
Portugal under-21 international footballers
Portuguese expatriate footballers
Expatriate footballers in Italy
Expatriate footballers in France
Expatriate footballers in Greece
Expatriate footballers in Cyprus
Portuguese expatriate sportspeople in Italy
Portuguese expatriate sportspeople in France
Portuguese expatriate sportspeople in Greece
Portuguese expatriate sportspeople in Cyprus
Sportspeople from Setúbal District